West Wyomissing is a census-designated place (CDP) in Spring Township, Berks County, Pennsylvania, United States. The population was 3,407 at the 2010 census.

Geography
West Wyomissing is located at  (40.322771, -75.994583).

Demographics
As of the census of 2000, there were 3,016 people, 1,363 households, and 894 families living in the CDP. The population density was 4,565.0 people per square mile (1,764.4/km). There were 1,411 housing units at an average density of 2,135.7/sq mi (825.4/km). The racial makeup of the CDP was 95.46% White, 1.26% African American, 0.07% Native American, 0.53% Asian, 0.03% Pacific Islander, 1.19% from other races, and 1.46% from two or more races. Hispanic or Latino of any race were 3.08% of the population.

There were 1,363 households, out of which 23.3% had children under the age of 18 living with them, 53.0% were married couples living together, 9.1% had a female householder with no husband present, and 34.4% were non-families. 29.4% of all households were made up of individuals, and 15.6% had someone living alone who was 65 years of age or older. The average household size was 2.21 and the average family size was 2.70.

In the CDP, the population was spread out, with 18.3% under the age of 18, 6.2% from 18 to 24, 27.8% from 25 to 44, 23.8% from 45 to 64, and 23.9% who were 65 years of age or older. The median age was 43 years. For every 100 females, there were 95.2 males. For every 100 females age 18 and over, there were 89.2 males.

The median income for a household in the CDP was $43,553, and the median income for a family was $51,429. Males had a median income of $37,791 versus $26,422 for females. The per capita income for the CDP was $20,969. About 1.4% of families and 3.1% of the population were below the poverty line, including 8.3% of those under age 18 and 2.9% of those age 65 or over.

References

Census-designated places in Berks County, Pennsylvania
Census-designated places in Pennsylvania